Moscharia is a genus of flowering plants in the family Asteraceae native to South America. It has two recognized species.

References

Asteraceae genera
Flora of South America
Nassauvieae